Delalande's sand frog (Tomopterna delalandii), also known as Delalande's frog, Cape sand frog, or striped pixie, is a species of frog in the family Pyxicephalidae. It is endemic to western and southern South Africa and occurs in the low-lying areas of Namaqualand, Western Cape, and Eastern Cape as far east as Cape St. Francis.

Etymology
The specific name delalandii honours Pierre Antoine Delalande, a French explorer and naturalist who collected in the Cape area in 1818.

Description
Tomopterna delalandii is a robust-bodied species with toad-like appearance and gait. Females can reach  in snout–vent length. The head is broad and the eyes are large and bulging. The legs are relatively short. There are no finger or toe discs but the toes have some webbing. The upper parts vary in colouration from light grey to dark brown, usually with a mottled appearance and a pale patch between the shoulders. There is also usually a pale vertebral stripe, and often a pale stripe on either side of the body. Males have a dark throat.

The male advertisement call is a series of short ringing notes, with about 6–8 notes per second.

Habitat and conservation
The species occurs in fynbos heath land and succulent karroo shrubland, and it can also live in agricultural land. Breeding takes place in both temporary and semi-permanent bodies of water found in pans, pools, vleis and dams, in flat, sandy areas. It is a very abundant species that occurs in several protected areas. It can be locally threatened by habitat loss caused by the spread of alien vegetation and agricultural and urban expansion.

References

Tomopterna
Frogs of Africa
Endemic amphibians of South Africa
Fynbos
Natural history of Cape Town
Amphibians described in 1838
Taxa named by Johann Jakob von Tschudi
Taxonomy articles created by Polbot